Cantemir is a district in the south of Moldova, with the administrative center at Cantemir.
As of January 1, 2011, its population was 62,800.

History

Localities with the earliest documentary attestation of the district are: Haragîș, Stoianeuca, Lărguța, Cîrpești localities approved for the first time in the period 1443-1489. In the 16th and 17th centuries, most of all to develop trade, agriculture and there is a significant population increase. In 1812, after the Russo-Turkish War (1806–12), is the occupation of Basarabia, Russian Empire during this period (1812–1856, 1878–1917), there is an intense russification of the native population. In 1856–78, after the Crimean War district is part of the Romania. In 1918 after the collapse of the Russian Empire, Bessarabia united with Romania in this period (1918–40, 1941–44), the district is part of the Ismail County. In 1940 after Molotov–Ribbentrop Pact, Basarabia is occupied by the USSR. In 1991 as a result of the proclamation of Independence of Moldova, part and residence of the Cahul County (1991–2003), and in 2003 became administrative unit of Moldova.

Geography
Cantemir district is located in the south part of the Republic of Moldova. Neighborhood has the following districts: Leova District in north, east Gagauzia, Cahul District in southern and border state in west to Romania, on the river Prut. The relief is generally hilly plain with the maximum altitude is 301 m hill Tigheci (Tigheci Plateau) in the western part of district. Minimum altitude 10–15 m (Lower Prut Plain ). Erosion processes with a medium intensity.

Climate
Temperate continental climate with an annual average district temperature +11 c. July average temperature +23 C, of January -3 C. Annual precipitation 450–550 mm. Average wind speed 3–6 m \ s.

Fauna
Typical European steppe fauna, with the presence of such mammals such as foxes, hedgehogs, deer, wild boar, polecat, wild cat, ermine and others. Of birds: partridges, crows, eagles, starling, swallow and more.

Flora
Forests occupy 11.3% of the district are complemented by tree species such as oak, ash, hornbeam, linden, maple, walnut and others. From plants: wormwood, knotweed, fescue, nettle and many others.

Rivers
The main river in the district is Prut, crosses district in the west. Its tributaries are usually short. Most lakes are artificial origin.

Administrative subdivisions
Localities: 51
Administrative center: Cantemir
Cities: Cantemir
Villages: 24
Communes: 26

Demographics

1 January 2012 the district population was 62,500 of which 9.6% urban and 90.4% rural population

Births (2010): 779 (12.4 per 1000)
Deaths (2010): 846 (13.4 per 1000)
Growth rate (2010): -67 (-1.0 per 1000)

Ethnic groups 

Footnote: * There is an ongoing controversy regarding the ethnic identification of Moldovans and Romanians.

Religion 
Christians - 98.1%
Orthodox Christians - 96.6%
Protestant - 1.5%
Baptists - 0.9%
Seventh-day Adventists - 0.4%
Pentecostals - 0.2%
Other - 1.0%
No Religion - 0.9%

Economy
The district is in total 18,186 registered businesses.
The share of agricultural land is 49,602 ha (57.0%) of them occupy 40 902 ha (47.0%) of arable land, plantations of orchards - 2272 ha (2.6%), vineyards - 5660 ha (6.5%), pastures - 11,500 ha (13.2% ). Main crops: cereals (wheat, oats), sunflower, canola, soybeans, vegetables.

Education
At activates Cantemir district, 41 educational institutions.
Total number of students, including 8967 children in schools, 130 students in vocational school in the Cantemir city.

Politics
Cantemir district granted priority mainly right-wing parties. In Moldova represented by the AEI. PCRM is a continuous fall in percentage the last three elections.

During the last three elections AEI had an increase of 47.5%

Elections

|-
!style="background-color:#E9E9E9" align=center colspan="2" valign=center|Parties and coalitions
!style="background-color:#E9E9E9" align=right|Votes
!style="background-color:#E9E9E9" align=right|%
!style="background-color:#E9E9E9" align=right|+/−
|-
| 
|align=left|Liberal Democratic Party of Moldova
|align="right"|9,124
|align="right"|34.80
|align="right"|+9.87
|-
| 
|align=left|Party of Communists of the Republic of Moldova
|align="right"|9,003
|align="right"|34.34
|align="right"|−6.47
|-
| 
|align=left|Democratic Party of Moldova
|align="right"|3,143
|align="right"|11,99
|align="right"|+1.92
|-
| 
|align=left|Liberal Party
|align="right"|2,037
|align="right"|7.77
|align="right"|−3.27
|-
|bgcolor=#0033cc|
|align=left|European Action Movement 
|align="right"|1,507
|align="right"|5.75
|align="right"|+5.75
|-
| 
|align=left|Party Alliance Our Moldova
|align="right"|269
|align="right"|1.03
|align="right"|-8.76
|-
|bgcolor="grey"|
|align=left|Other Party
|align="right"|1,139
|align="right"|4.32
|align="right"|+0.96
|-
|align=left style="background-color:#E9E9E9" colspan="2"|Total (turnout 57.98%)
|width="30" align="right" style="background-color:#E9E9E9"|26,379
|width="30" align="right" style="background-color:#E9E9E9"|100.00
|width="30" align="right" style="background-color:#E9E9E9"|

Culture

In district works: 3 museums, 76 artistic including 24 bands holding the title of the band modern, 46 libraries, 43 houses and community centers.

Health
The district works: a hospital with general fund of 220 beds. A center of family doctors in the composition of which are 25 offices of the family doctor, 4 health centers. In health care population of Cantemir district operates 64 doctor's, 263 average staff, nurses, 254 auxiliary health staff.

References

 Discuție:Raionul Cantemir
 District population per year
 Results of 2010 parliamentary election

 
Districts of Moldova